Kevin Kelton is an American television writer and producer whose credits include Saturday Night Live, Night Court, Boy Meets World and other network series. He has also written articles and essays for National Lampoon. Kelton is the younger brother of the comedian Bobby Kelton, who appeared regularly on The Tonight Show Starring Johnny Carson during the 1970s and 1980s. Kevin now teaches TV and Film writing for the UCLA Extension Writers' Program.

Television 
Kelton's first TV writing job was on the syndicated game show Face the Music. He segued to sketch comedy, joining the writing staff of the ABC late-night sketch show Fridays!. He went on to write for a string of sketch comedy series before being hired by Saturday Night Live as a staff writer at the beginning of the 1983–84 season. During this time, the writing staff earned an Emmy nomination.

Credits 
Face the Music – syndicated (staff writer – 1980)
Fridays! – ABC (staff writer – 1980)
Nashville Palace – NBC (staff writer – 1981)
Laugh Trax – syndicated (staff writer – 1981–1982)
Steve Martin's Twilight Theatre – NBC (staff writer – 1982)
No Soap, Radio – ABC (staff writer – 1982)
The Jeffersons – CBS (story credit) (1983)
Saturday Night Live – (staff writer – 1983–1985)
Comedy Break with Mack and Jamie – syndicated (staff writer – 1985–1986)
The Jay Leno Special – NBC (staff writer – 1986)
Women in Prison – FOX (staff writer – 1987–1988)
The Van Dyke Show – CBS (Story Editor – 1988)
Knight & Daye – NBC (Executive Story Editor – 1989)
A Different World – NBC (Executive Story Editor – 1989–1990)
Night Court – NBC (Producer – 1990–1992)
Shaky Ground – FOX (Producer – 1992–1993)
Townsend Television – FOX (writer – 1994)
As Seen on TV (pilot) – F/X (Co-Executive Producer – 1994)
Boy Meets World – ABC (Producer – 1994–1996)
Something So Right – NBC (Supervising Producer – 1996–1997)
The Tom Show – WB (Co-Executive Producer – 1997–1998)
The Wrong Coast – AMC (Consulting Producer – 2002–1903)
National Lampoon (Contributing Writer – 2003–2004)
Girlfriend Guy web series (Consulting Producer – 2016–2018)
BIFL web series (Writing Consultant – 2019)

References

External links 
 

1956 births
People from Rockville Centre, New York
People from Long Island
Living people
American television writers
American male television writers
Screenwriters from New York (state)